Lebanon is a small, unincorporated community in Montezuma County, Colorado, United States. It is located north of Cortez, Colorado and is served by the Dolores Post Office, Zip Code 81323.

A post office called Lebanon was established in 1908, and remained in operation until 1939. The community was named after the Cedars of Lebanon.

References

Unincorporated communities in Montezuma County, Colorado
Unincorporated communities in Colorado